Boddam Masonic Hall is an historic building in Boddam, Aberdeenshire, Scotland. It is a Category B listed structure, located a few hundred yards west of Buchan Ness Lighthouse.

See also
List of listed buildings in Peterhead, Aberdeenshire

References

External links
1087 Dundonnie – Masonic Maps
Boddam Masonic Hall – Google Street View, September 2008

Category B listed buildings in Aberdeenshire
Buildings and structures in Boddam
Masonic buildings in Scotland